Khazana is a 1987 Indian Hindi-language action-adventure film, produced by Subhash Kapoor under the Subhash International banner and directed by Harmesh Malhotra. It stars Randhir Kapoor and Rekha, while Jeetendra, Rishi Kapoor have special appearances and music was composed by Laxmikant–Pyarelal. The movie is loosely based on the 1984 Kannada movie Gandu Bherunda which in turn was inspired by the 1969 American film Mackenna's Gold.

Plot
Rajkumar, a garage mechanic, lives in a middle-classed lifestyle in Bombay along with his father Shantidas. One day, Rajkumar was informed that his father had been arrested for a robbery of  jewelry. Rajkumar goes to visit his father and finds that he has been hospitalized in Nanavati Hospital. The doctor informs that chances of recovery are good. The next day, however, Shantidas passes away and Rajkumar notifies the Police of foul play, but they refuse to believe him. Rajkumar has a glove that was in his deceased father's hand and with this he sets out to find his father's killers, not realizing that this will take him from Delhi, them to Bikaner and thereafter into a desert where his efforts will be interrupted by an assorted group of gangsters, city folk, and gypsies on the hunt for an elusive treasure that is hidden in a mountainous cave.

Cast
Randhir Kapoor as Raj Kumar 
Rekha as Anita Mathur
Bindu as Sonam
Ranjeet as Ramesh Sinha
Madan Puri as Jai Singh
Dev Kumar as Raka
Mohan Sherry as Usman
Jeetendra as Singer / Dancer
Rishi Kapoor as Singer / Dancer

Music
The music of the film was composed by Laxmikant-Pyarelal and the lyrics were penned by Anand Bakshi.

References

External links

1980s Hindi-language films
Treasure hunt films
Hindi remakes of Kannada films
Indian action adventure films
1980s action adventure films